Like all municipalities of Puerto Rico, San Sebastián is subdivided into administrative units called barrios, which are roughly comparable to minor civil divisions, (and means wards or boroughs or neighborhoods in English). The barrios and subbarrios, in turn, are further subdivided into smaller local populated place areas/units called sectores (sectors in English). The types of sectores may vary, from normally sector to urbanización to reparto to barriada to residencial, among others.

List of sectors by barrio

Aibonito
 Barrio Aibonito Beltrán
 Barrio Aibonito Guerrero
 Carretera 119
 Carretera 447
 Carretera 457
 Nayo Méndez
 Sector Adames
 Sector Agustín Rodríguez
 Sector Casa del Biólogo
 Sector Ciquito López
 Sector Cruz Lugo
 Sector El Maní
 Sector Fano Mercado
 Sector Gelo Esteves
 Sector Goyo Guerrero
 Sector Lalo Jiménez
 Sector Las Cruces
 Sector Lilo Méndez
 Sector Los Malavé
 Sector Los Pérez
 Sector Los Rodríguez
 Sector Medina
 Sector Millo Méndez (Cardona Méndez)
 Sector Morales
 Sector Onofre Cardona (Mino Rosa)
 Sector Santos González
 Sector Valentín
 Urbanización Lomas de Aibonito Guerrero

Alto Sano
 Carretera 109
 Sector El Cuartelillo
 Sector Los Ramírez

Bahomamey
 Barriada Pueblo Nuevo
 Barriada Stalingrado
 Barriada Tablastilla
 Calle Juan F. Cortés
 Sector Chinto Rodón
 Urbanización Guayabal
 Urbanización Olivencia

Calabazas

 Carretera 111
 Carretera 4435
 Residencial Jardines de Piedras Blancas
 Sector Audeliz Torres
 Sector Bartolo Cordero
 Sector Cataño
 Sector El Refugio
 Sector Jandino Ruiz
 Sector La Loma
 Sector Lupe Mártir
 Sector Mamey
 Sector Orta
 Sector Pablo Nieves (Los Pinos)
 Sector Quinto Ríos
 Sector Rancho Grande
 Sector Rubén Hernández
 Sector Toño Mestre
 Urbanización Jardines Villy Ana
 Urbanización Raholisa
 Urbanización Venturini
 Urbanización Villas de Piedras Blancas

Cibao
 Avenida Emérito Estrada Rivera
 Carretera 451
 Carretera 455
 Cibao Abrahonda
 Comunidad González
 Parcelas Montaña de Piedra
 Residencial Andrés Méndez Liciaga
 Residencial San Andrés
 Sector Ango Román
 Sector Finca Los Robles
 Sector La Gallera
 Sector Ortíz
 Sector Pablo Rivera
 Sector Pueblito
 Sector Pueblo Nuevo
 Sector Quiles
 Urbanización Colinas Verdes
 Urbanización Montaña de Piedra
 Urbanización Pepino

Cidral
 Carretera 450
 Sector La Laguna
 Sector Los Rosario
 Sector Martínez
 Sector Mín Pérez
 Sector Nolo González
 Sector Palmarito
 Sector Pancho Soto
 Sector Tomassini

Culebrinas
 Calle Torres Pino
 Carretera 109
 Sector Bernal
 Sector Flores Rivera
 Sector Juancho Román
 Sector Lin Ríos
 Sector Los Nobles
 Sector Peter Hernández
 Sector Pozas Central
 Sector Quebrada Larga
 Sector Toño Rosa
 Sector Rincón
 Urbanización Ciudad de Oro
 Urbanización El Culebrinas
 Urbanización La Estancia
 Urbanización Mansiones del Culebrinas

Eneas
 Sector Brignoni
 Sector Delia Ramos
 Sector Loma Alta

Guacio
 Carretera 119
 Carretera 424
 Carretera 433
 Parcelas El Guacio
 Parcelas Marco Antonio
 Sector Boquerón
 Sector Campamento Boys Scouts
 Sector Domenech
 Sector Inglés
 Sector Lulo Rivera
 Sector Tosquero

Guajataca
 Carretera 455
 Sector Colo Medina
 Sector Confesor Soto
 Sector Empalme
 Sector Fondo del Saco
 Sector Lebrón
 Sector Los Vázquez
 Sector Millo Matos
 Sector Roberto Jiménez
 Sector Román
 Sector Salto Collazo
 Sector Sico Aponte
 Sector Toño Fuentes
 Sector Varela
 Sector Yeyo González

Guatemala

 Avenida Emérito Estrada Rivera
 Carretera 111
 Carretera 125
 Carretera 445
 Carretera 446
 Sector Barandillo
 Sector Bejuco
 Sector Central Plata
 Sector Colón
 Sector Goyin Rámirez
 Sector Javilla
 Sector Laberinto
 Sector La Vega
 Sector Marcelo Pérez
 Sector Méndez
 Sector Peña
 Sector Rincón (Gozalandia)
 Sector Salsipuedes
 Sector Torres
 Urbanización Extensión Villa Rita
 Urbanización Jardines de Guatemala
 Urbanización Mansiones de Loma Linda
 Urbanización San Antonio de La Plata
 Urbanización San Carmelo de la Plata
 Urbanización Villa Rita

Hato Arriba

 Carretera 111
 Carretera 125
 Carretera 423
 Parcelas Hato Arriba
 Sector Anglada
 Sector Bernal
 Sector Campo Alegre
 Sector Caña Verde
 Sector Cuesta La Luna
 Sector Hoyo Frío
 Sector Hoyo Santo
 Sector Medina
 Sector Nando Rivera
 Sector Paseo Central
 Sector Punta Brava
 Sector Santo Torres
 Urbanización Colinas de Hato Arriba
 Urbanización Lomas Verdes

Hoya Mala
 Carretera 119
 Carretera 447
 Carretera 448
 Sector Capilla Católica
 Sector Daniel Méndez
 Sector Esteban Cardona
 Sector Gabriel Jiménez
 Sector Jiménez
 Sector Julio Lugo
 Sector La 21
 Sector Las Toscas
 Sector Lechuza
 Sector Mercado
 Sector Monroig
 Sector Pascual Ruiz
 Sector Planta de Gas
 Sector Porto Román
 Sector Sharon

Juncal
 Carretera 111
 Sector Ballajá
 Sector Iglesia Adventista (Rodríguez)
 Sector Juncal Centro
 Sector Pueblito
 Sector Santiago
 Sector Terraza de Santiago

Magos
 Carretera 438
 Carretera 451
 Carretera 470
 Sector Ballester
 Sector La Cuadra
 Sector Melito Oliva
 Sector Miguel A. Pérez
 Sector Puente Lajas
 Sector Pujols
 Sector Sonoco
 Sector Toño Jiménez
 Urbanización Santa Teresita

Mirabales
 Carretera 433
 Sector Quebrada Las Cañas
 Sector Los Pérez
 Sector Núñez

Perchas 1

 Carretera 435
 Carretera 4435
 Sector Quebrada Las Cañas

Perchas 2

 Carretera 124
 Carretera 435
 Comunidad Alturas de Borinquén
 Parcelas García Méndez
 Sector Ángel Ríos
 Sector Entrada Oronoz
 Sector Finca Los Abuelos
 Sector Genaro Vélez
 Sector Lito Rodríguez
 Sector Olavarría
 Sector Pablo Fernández
 Sector Pelo Muerto
 Sector Perfecto Rodríguez
 Sector Parcelas González
 Sector Pulio Rodríguez
 Sector Santo Domingo
 Sector Tosquera

Piedras Blancas
 Avenida Emérito Estrada Rivera
 Barriada Segarra (Cuchilandia)
 Carretera 111
 Carretera 119
 Carretera 125
 Sector Las Palmas (Escuela Bilingüe)
 Sector Lindín
 Sector Los Pinos
 Sector Tito Ríos
 Urbanización Ubiñas
 Urbanización Valle Verde

Pozas
 Carretera 109
 Carretera 424
 Carretera 497
 Reparto Feliciano
 Sector Arvelo Rivera
 Sector Colón
 Sector Los Crespo
 Sector Los González
 Sector Los Reyes
 Sector Los Rosado
 Sector Los Traversos
 Sector Méndez
 Sector Ortiz
 Sector Pozas Gardens
 Sector Quintana
 Sector Valle Real

Robles
 Carretera 446
 Carretera 447
 Carretera 4446
 Sector Cuatro Calles
 Sector El Paraíso
 Sector Farel Velázquez
 Sector Genove González
 Sector La Conquista
 Sector Las Piedras
 Sector Lito Ramos
 Sector Pedro Lisojo
 Sector Peña
 Sector Pochín Serrano
 Sector Ricardo Morales
 Urbanización Antonio Muñiz

Salto
 Carretera 445
 Sector Agapito Rosado
 Sector Carmelo Serrano
 Sector Cerro Sombrero
 Sector Dómenech
 Sector Felo Ruiz
 Sector Ferdinand Hernández
 Sector Frank Aquino
 Sector La Piedra
 Sector Liono Ramos
 Sector López
 Sector Manuel González
 Sector Minín Vélez
 Sector Morales
 Sector Tamarindo
 Sector Trujillo
 Sector Villa Linda
 Sector Villa Morales

San Sebastián barrio-pueblo

 Avenida Emérito Estrada Rivera
 Calle Andrés M. Liciaga
 Calle Andrés Velázquez
 Calle Ángel Mislán
 Calle Betances
 Calle Emilio Ruiz
 Calle Hipólito Castro
 Calle Hostos
 Calle Jesús T Piñero
 Calle J. Méndez Cardona
 Calle M. J. Cabrero
 Calle Muñoz Rivera
 Calle Padre Feliciano
 Calle Pavía Fernández
 Calle Raúl Gaya Benejam
 Calle Ruiz Belvis
 Calle Severo Arana
 Calle 25 de Julio
 Norzagaray subbarrio
 Residencial San Sebastián Court
 Residencial Villa Soigal
 Sector Paralelo 38
 Sector Rabo del Buey
 Urbanización Guayabal
 Urbanización Los Alamos
 Urbanización Pedro T. Labayen
 Urbanización Román
 Urréjola subbarrio

Sonador
 Carretera 423
 Carretera 497
 Parcelas Sonador
 Sector Álvarez
 Sector Andrés Torres
 Sector Berto Vargas
 Sector Cruz Montalvo
 Sector El Callejón
 Sector El Túnel
 Sector Entrada Chaín
 Sector Gelo Ramos
 Sector José Manuel Soto
 Sector Julio Nieves
 Sector Justo Pérez
 Sector La Parada
 Sector La Pluma Pública
 Sector La Vanguardia
 Sector Manolo Quiles
 Sector Maximino Soto
 Sector Montalvo
 Sector Ortiz
 Sector Pello Sánchez
 Sector Puente Nuevo
 Sector Siso Quiles
 Sector Tito Bondo
 Urbanización Brisas del Río Sonador

See also

 List of communities in Puerto Rico

References

San Sebastián
San Sebastián